Jorge Martín Araujo Paredes (born 30 November 1979) is a Peruvian football coach and former player who played as a defender. He is the assistant manager of Universitario de Deportes.

Career
Born in Lima, Araujo has played over 100 games for both Universitario de Deportes and Alianza Atlético. He was also a member of the Peruvian national team on one occasion in 2003.

Coaching career
On 29 January 2018, Araujo was appointed assistant manager of his last club, Academia Deportiva Cantolao. In December 2018 it was then confirmed, that he would be the club's head coach for the 2019 season. He was fired at the end of 2019.

References

External links
 
 
 

1979 births
Living people
Footballers from Lima
Association football defenders
Peruvian footballers
Peru international footballers
Sport Boys footballers
Cienciano footballers
Club Universitario de Deportes footballers
Alianza Atlético footballers
José Gálvez FBC footballers
Juan Aurich footballers
León de Huánuco footballers
Peruvian Primera División players
Peruvian Segunda División players
Peruvian football managers
Club Universitario de Deportes managers
Academia Deportiva Cantolao managers